Dositej Novaković (c. 1774–1854) was an  Orthodox priest in the Ottoman Empire and later the first Serbian bishop of Timok from 1834 to 1854.

Biography
Novaković was born in the small village of Dabnica close to Prilep around 1774. As a young man, he joined the fraternity of the Treskavec Monastery. Soon afterwards he left Treskavac for Mount Athos and the Bulgarian Zograf Monastery, where he became a monk.

After returning to Prilep, Novaković came into conflict with the local Muslims and, fearing for his life, he decided to flee northwards towards the Niš Eyalet. He first came to Pirot and then to Niš, where he serves as an aid to bishop Meletius. In May 1821, fearing that the local Christians would rise to arms inspired by the Wallachian uprising of 1821, the Ottomans murdered bishop Meletius together with several other churchmen. Novaković managed to escape to the newly established Principality of Serbia where he was appointed first as abbot of the Serbian monastery Sveta Petka and later on of the Serbian Gornjak Monastery.

In 1834 the Timočka Krajina region was ceded from the Ottoman Empire to the Principality of Serbia, Prince Miloš Obrenović decided to form a new diocese in the area. The Metropolitan of Serbia decided to name Novaković as the first bishop of Timok, the position on which he remained for the next two decades. The seat of the diocese was first in Zaječar but was soon transferred to Negotin. Bishop Dositej is remembered as a kind and benevolent men, who was especially keen on helping pupils from his diocese that continued their schooling in Belgrade.

In 1846 Novaković became a member of the Serbian Learned Society, the precursor of the present-day Serbian Academy of Arts and Sciences.

Novaković died on 2 April 1854. His modest grave originally stood in the churchyard of the old Serbian church in Negotin while later on it was moved inside of it.

References

1774 births
1854 deaths
19th-century Serbian people
Bishops of the Serbian Orthodox Church
Serbs of North Macedonia
People from the Principality of Serbia
Serbs from the Ottoman Empire
People from Negotin